Download Series Volume 5 is a live album by the rock band the Grateful Dead.  It includes the complete concert recorded on March 27, 1988, at the Hampton Coliseum in Hampton, Virginia.  It was released as a digital download on September 6, 2005.

Except for the first two songs being from an "Ultra-Matrix" soundboard/audience tape hybrid, the concert is from the soundboard master.  The album was mastered in HDCD by Jeffrey Norman.

The show included one of only eight times the Grateful Dead played Bob Dylan's "Ballad of a Thin Man". The show also features the only time the band performed Miles Davis' "So What".

Track listing
Disc one
First set:
"Iko Iko" (James "Sugar Boy" Crawford, Barbara Anne Hawkins, Rosa Lee Hawkins, Joan Marie Johnson) - 5:06
"Little Red Rooster" (Willie Dixon) - 8:32
"Stagger Lee" (Jerry Garcia, Robert Hunter) - 5:33
"Ballad of a Thin Man" > (Bob Dylan) - 7:04
"Cumberland Blues" > (Garcia, Phil Lesh, Hunter) - 5:02
"Me and My Uncle" > (John Phillips) - 3:10
"To Lay Me Down" > (Garcia, Hunter) - 8:03
"Let It Grow" (Bob Weir, John Perry Barlow) - 11:35
Disc two
Second set:
"Space" > (Garcia, Lesh, Weir) - 2:19
"So What" > (Miles Davis) - 0:57
"Sugar Magnolia" > (Weir, Hunter) - 5:13
"Scarlet Begonias" > (Garcia, Hunter) - 10:55
"Fire on the Mountain" (Mickey Hart, Hunter) - 10:40
"Estimated Prophet" > (Weir, Barlow) - 10:29
"Eyes Of The World" > (Garcia, Hunter) - 8:31
"Rhythm Devils" > (Hart, Bill Kreutzmann) - 7:28
Disc three
"Space" > (Garcia, Lesh, Weir) - 7:30
"Goin' Down the Road Feeling Bad" > (traditional, arranged by Grateful Dead) - 5:52
"I Need a Miracle" > (Weir, Barlow) - 3:20
"Dear Mr. Fantasy" > (Jim Capaldi, Steve Winwood, Chris Wood) - 4:53
"Sunshine Daydream" (Weir, Hunter) - 4:10
Encore: 
"U.S. Blues" (Garcia, Hunter) - 5:43

Personnel
Grateful Dead
Jerry Garcia – lead guitar, vocals 
Brent Mydland – keyboards, vocals 
Mickey Hart – drums 
Bill Kreutzmann – drums
Phil Lesh – electric bass
Bob Weir – rhythm guitar, vocals
Production
Dan Healy – recording
Jeffrey Norman – mastering

References

05
2005 live albums